Gordon Bernie Kaufmann (19 March 1888 – 1 March 1949) was an English-born American architect mostly known for his work on the Hoover Dam.

Early life 
On 19 March 1888, Kaufmann was born in Forest Hill, London, England.

Education 
Kaufmann attended Whitgift School in south Croydon, and went on to graduate from the London Polytechnic Institute, circa 1908. Kaufmann then moved to Vancouver in British Columbia, where he spent the next six years.

Career 

During Kaufmann's early career, he did much work in the Mediterranean Revival Style, which had become popular at that time. He was also the initial architect for Scripps College, a liberal arts women's college in Claremont, California. It is a member of the Claremont Colleges.

Kaufmann, along with landscape architect Edward Huntsman-Trout, designed the general campus plan featuring four residence halls to be built the first four consecutive years of the College (1927–1930). The project's design is primarily in the Mediterranean Revival style.

While gaining recognition for Kaufmann's work on the Scripps campus, he was also hired by California Institute of Technology in 1928 to design the complex of dormitories now known as the South Houses, and the building for the Athenaeum, a private club located on the school's campus.

Later in his career, Kaufmann worked primarily in the Art Deco style, with a personal emphasis on massively thick, streamlined concrete walls which gave his buildings a very distinctive appearance. Kaufmann's buildings as a result took on a very "mechanical" appearance, often resembling huge versions of old-fashioned appliances. The Los Angeles Times''' headquarters is a perfect example of this. His work was also part of the architecture event in the art competition at the 1936 Summer Olympics.

 Projects 
This is a selected list of Kaufmann's projects.
 1920 Hacienda del Gato, Tradition Golf Club - 78-505 52nd Avenue, La Quinta, California, Architect
 1924 Hale Solar Laboratory, California Institute of Technology - 740 Holladay Road, Pasadena, California, Architect
 1926 La Quinta Resort & Club - 49-499 Eisenhower Drive, La Quinta, California. Architect.
 1926 Milton Getz House (also known as Beverly Estate) - 1011 North Beverly Drive, Beverly Hills, California. Architect.
 1926 Scripps College for Women - 1030 Columbia Avenue, Claremont, California. Architect.
 1928 Greystone Mansion – 905 Loma Vista Drive, Beverly Hills, California. Architect.
 1929 Holmby Hall – 921 Westwood Boulevard, Los Angeles, California. Architect.
 1930 Athenaeum, California Institute of Technology – 551 South Hill Avenue, Pasadena, California. Architect. 
 1932  Harper Hall, Claremont Graduate University – 150 East 10th Street, Claremont, California. Architect. 
 1934 Santa Anita Park – 285 West Huntington Drive, Arcadia, California. Architect.
 1935 Hoover Dam
 1935 Los Angeles Times Building – 202 West 1st St, Los Angeles, California. Architect.
 1936 United States Post Office (San Pedro, Los Angeles) – Architect, with W. Horace Austin.
 1939 Arrowhead Springs Hotel – 24918 Arrowhead Springs Road, San Bernardino, California. Architect.
 1940 Hollywood Palladium – 6201 W. Sunset Blvd, Los Angeles, California. Architect.

 Personal life 
In 1914, Kaufmann moved to California and settled in Fresno, California.
Kaufmann's wife was Elsie Bryant Kaufmann.
On 1 March 1949, Kaufmann died in Los Angeles California. Kaufmann is buried in Golden Gate National Cemetery in San Bruno, California.

References

 External links 
Pacific Coast Architecture Database: Gordon Kaufmann — projects and completed works''
 Master Architects of Southern California 1920–1941: Gordon Kaufmann
 Architect Gordon Kaufmann (1888–1949) at modernlivingla.com

20th-century American architects
Architects from Los Angeles
Art Deco architects
Mediterranean Revival architects
Spanish Colonial Revival architects
British emigrants to the United States
1888 births
1949 deaths
People educated at Whitgift School
Olympic competitors in art competitions